Wisterman is an unincorporated community in Putnam County, in the U.S. state of Ohio.

History
Wisterman was platted in 1883 when the railroad was extended to that point. A post office called Wisterman was established in 1880, and remained in operation until 1910.

Notable person
Ivan Eastman, a sport shooter who competed in the 1908 Summer Olympics, was born in Wisterman in 1884.

References

Unincorporated communities in Putnam County, Ohio
Unincorporated communities in Ohio